The 2011–12 season was Queen of the South's tenth consecutive season in the Scottish First Division, having been promoted from the Scottish Second Division at the end of the 2001–02 season. Queens also competed in the Challenge Cup, League Cup and the Scottish Cup.

Summary
Queen of the South finished tenth in the First Division and were relegated to the Second Division. They reached the first round of the Challenge Cup, the third round of the League Cup and the fifth round of the Scottish Cup.

Management
The club began the 2011–12 season under the management of Gus MacPherson. On 30 April 2012, MacPherson resigned after relegation was confirmed. On 3 May, Allan Johnston was appointed as manager.

Results and fixtures

Pre season

Scottish First Division

Scottish League Cup

Challenge Cup

Scottish Cup

Player statistics

Captains

Squad
Last updated 5 May 2012

|}

Disciplinary record

Includes all competitive matches.

Last updated 5 May 2012

Top scorers

Last updated on 5 May 2012

Clean sheets

{| class="wikitable" style="font-size: 95%; text-align: center;"
|-
!width=15|
!width=15|
!width=15|
!width=150|Name
!width=80|League
!width=80|Scottish Cup
!width=80|League Cup
!width=80|Challenge Cup
!width=80|Total
|-
|1
|GK
|
|Lee Robinson
|7
|1
|1
|0
|9
|-
|2
|GK
|
|Roddy McKenzie
|0
|0
|0
|0
|0
|-
|
|
|
! Totals !! 6 !! 1 !! 1 !! 0 !! 8

Team statistics

League table

Results summary

Results by round

Results by opponent

Last updated on 5 May 2012

Source: 2011–12 Scottish First Division Results Table 
a.  Queen of the South's score is shown first.

Transfers

Players in

Players out

See also
List of Queen of the South F.C. seasons

References

2011–12
Queen of the South